Chionanthus curvicarpus grows as a tree up to  tall, with a trunk diameter of up to . The bark is whitish grey or brown. The flowers are yellowish, sometimes greenish white. The specific epithet curvicarpus is from the Latin and Greek meaning "curved fruit". Habitat is forest from sea-level to  altitude. C. curvicarpus is found in Sumatra, Peninsular Malaysia and Borneo.

References

curvicarpus
Plants described in 1984
Trees of Sumatra
Trees of Malaya
Trees of Borneo